Zeydabad (also Romanized as Zeydābād, Zaidābād, and Zeid Abad) is a city in the Central District of Sirjan County, Kerman Province, Iran.  At the 2006 census, its population was 5,314, in 1,283 families.

References

Populated places in Sirjan County

Cities in Kerman Province